The Italian Job (2001 video game)
The Italian Job (2003 video game)